Christopher Don Houston (born October 18, 1984) is a former American football cornerback who played in the National Football League (NFL). He played college football at Arkansas, and was drafted by the Atlanta Falcons in the second round of the 2007 NFL Draft. Houston was also a member of the Detroit Lions and Carolina Panthers.

Early years

Houston attended Mendez Middle School and LBJ High School in Austin, Texas, where he played running back and cornerback. During his senior year he rushed for 426 yards and six touchdowns, before moving exclusively to cornerback. He was also a shooting guard on the school's basketball team.

College career

Houston attended The University of Arkansas from 2003 to 2006. During his junior year in Fayetteville, he was a Pro Football Weekly All-American honorable mention and All-Southeastern Conference second-team selection by the league's coaches and Associated Press. He finished his college career with 89 tackles, three interceptions, three forced fumbles and a touchdown for the Razorbacks.

After his junior year, Houston decided to forgo his senior season with the Hogs and enter the 2007 NFL Draft.

Professional career

2007 NFL Combine

Atlanta Falcons
Houston was drafted by the Atlanta Falcons in the second round of the 2007 NFL Draft. During his second season in 2008, against the Kansas City Chiefs, he had his first career interception and returned it for a touchdown. In three years with the Falcons he started 37 of 44 games, recording 166 tackles and three interceptions.

Detroit Lions
On March 8, 2010, Houston was traded to the Detroit Lions for a sixth-round pick in the 2010 NFL Draft and a conditional seventh round pick in the 2011 NFL Draft.

On June 13, 2014, the Lions released him due to injury concerns.

Carolina Panthers
Houston signed with the Carolina Panthers on June 15, 2015. He announced his retirement on August 4, 2015.

NFL statistics

Key
 GP: games played
 COMB: combined tackles
 TOTAL: total tackles
 AST: assisted tackles
 SACK: sacks
 FF: forced fumbles
 FR: fumble recoveries
 FR YDS: fumble return yards 
 INT: interceptions
 IR YDS: interception return yards
 AVG IR: average interception return
 LNG: longest interception return
 TD: interceptions returned for touchdown
 PD: passes defensed

References

External links

Atlanta Falcons bio 
Arkansas Razorbacks bio

1984 births
Living people
Players of American football from Austin, Texas
African-American players of American football
Arkansas Razorbacks football players
American football cornerbacks
Atlanta Falcons players
Detroit Lions players
Carolina Panthers players
21st-century African-American sportspeople
20th-century African-American people